Business Academy Aarhus is a school of higher education in Aarhus, Denmark founded on 1 January 2009. The academy is an independent self-owning institution subordinated to the Ministry of Science, Innovation and Higher Education. Degree programmes offered are mainly applied degrees, especially in technology, IT and business. The academy grants undergraduate and academic degrees but not master's or doctoral degrees. In addition to full-time studies the academy offers supplemental education, part-time programmes at bachelor's level and short-term courses for people who need to strengthen their qualifications. The academy is one of the largest business academies in Denmark.

The academy has 5,000 full-time students including 600 international students and 5,000 part-time students and about 400 employees.

Programmes

Academy Profession Degree Programme 
An Academy Profession (AP) degree is an undergraduate academic degree. This comprehensive 2-2½ year programme is similar to the first two years of a bachelor's degree and awards 120 ECTS.

 Automation Engineering (Automationsteknolog)
 Automotive Technology (Autoteknolog)
 Chemical and Biotechnical Science (Laborant)
 Construction and Business (Byggekoordinator)
 Computer Science (Datamatiker)
 Financial Controlling (Financial Controller)
 Financial Management (Finansøkonom)
 IT Technology (IT-teknolog) 
 Marketing Management (Markedsføringsøkonom)
 Production Technology (Produktionsteknolog)
 Service, Hospitality and Tourism Management (Serviceøkonom)
 Multimedia Design (Multimediedesigner)

Bachelor's degrees 
Bachelor's programmes
A full bachelor's degree programme lasts for 3½ years. Students earn 210 ECTS for a full programme.

Bachelor's top-up programmes
On completion of an AP degree (or similar from abroad), it is possible to take another 1½ years of full-time studies and be awarded 90 ECTS. An AP degree programme combined with the Bachelor's top-up programme is equivalent to a full bachelor's degree.

 Chemical and Biotechnical Technology and Food Technology
 Financial Management and Services
 International Sales and Marketing
 Innovation and Entrepreneurship
 Product Development and Integrative Technology
 Software Development
 Web Development
 Business Economics and Information Technology
 Digital Concept Development

References

External links

 Business Academy Aarhus
 Profile on the Education Guide website of the Danish Ministry of Science, Innovation and Higher Education
 Translations of Danish educational terms through proclamations of the Ministry of Science, Innovation and Higher Education

¨

Higher education in Aarhus